Hans Peter Sørensen (1886–1962) was the second Lord Mayor of Copenhagen, holding that office from 1946 to 1956 as a member of the Social Democratic Party.

References

1886 births
1962 deaths
Mayors of places in Denmark
Social Democrats (Denmark) politicians